The PFL 10 mixed martial arts event for the 2022 season of the Professional Fighters League was held on November 25, 2022, at the Hulu Theater in New York City, United States. This was the finale of the playoffs for all 2022 divisions, with the winners getting a $1 million cash prize. The event also marked the organization's first pay-per-view card, being available on ESPN+ PPV.

Background 
Kayla Harrison, a two-time Olympic gold medalist in judo and seeking her third PFL championship, headlined the PFL event opposite Larissa Pacheco, who previously faced Harrison in two other title bouts, losing both by unanimous decision. The event also featured five other finals matchups, with the winner of each weight class taking home PFL's trademark $1 million dollar prize.

The five other championship bouts included a welterweight bout between Sadibou Sy and Dilano Taylor, Brendan Loughnane versus Bellator vet Bubba Jenkins at featherweight, a heavyweight bout between Ante Delija and Matheus Scheffel, UFC vets Rob Wilkinson and Omari Akhmedov at light heavyweight, and another pair of UFC vets in Stevie Ray and Olivier Aubin-Mercier at lightweight.

The event was to feature the PFL debuts of Shane Burgos and former WSOF Bantamweight Champion Marlon Moraes, facing off in a featherweight bout. However, Burgos withdrew from the bout due to an injury. He was replaced by Sheymon Moraes.

Results

2022 PFL Heavyweight playoffs

2022 PFL Light Heavyweight playoffs

2022 PFL Welterweight playoffs

2022 PFL Lightweight playoffs

2022 PFL Featherweight playoffs

2022 PFL Women's Lightweight playoffs

See also
 List of PFL events
 List of current PFL fighters

References 

2022 in sports in New York City
Professional Fighters League
2022 in mixed martial arts
November 2022 sports events in the United States
Sporting events in New York City
Mixed martial arts events